The lesser hairy-winged bat (Harpiocephalus harpia) is a species of vesper bat in the family Vespertilionidae.  It can be found in India, Indonesia, the Philippines, and Taiwan. They are known to eat various species of beetles. It is the only species in the genus Harpiocephalus.

References

Murininae
Mammals of India
Taxonomy articles created by Polbot
Taxa named by Coenraad Jacob Temminck
Mammals described in 1840
Bats of Asia